The 1948 South American Basketball Championship for Women was the 2nd regional tournament for women in South America. It was held in Buenos Aires, Argentina and won by Argentina. Three teams competed.

Final rankings

Results

Each team played the other teams twice, for a total of four games played by each team.

External links
FIBA Archive

1948
1948 in women's basketball
International women's basketball competitions hosted by Argentina
1948 in Argentine sport
1948
May 1948 sports events in South America
1940s in Buenos Aires